Purzycki (feminine: Purzycka; plural: Purzyccy) is a surname. It may refer to:

 Adrian Purzycki (born 1997), Polish football player
 Joe Purzycki (born 1947), American football coach
 Mick Purzycki (born 1987), American internet entrepreneur
 Mike Purzycki (born 1945), American businessman and politician

See also
 

Polish-language surnames